Weergevonden is a 1914 Dutch silent film directed by Louis H. Chrispijn. It was the first film produced by Hollandia Studios and one of the first Dutch feature films.

Cast
Louis H. Chrispijn	 ... 	Vader / Father
Enny de Leeuwe	... 	Lea
Jan van Dommelen	... 	Niet-joodse dokter / Non-Jewish doctor
Eugenie Krix	... 	Moeder van de doker / Doctor's mother / Deftige dame in restaurant 
Alex Benno	... 	Rabbijn / Rabbi
Annie Bos	... 	Boerin / Farmer's wife / Vrouw in restaurant / Woman in restaurant
Christine van Meeteren	... 	Buurvrouw / Neighbour
Louis van Dommelen		
Ansje van Dommelen-Kapper		
Lau Ezerman		
Theo Frenkel Jr.		
Koba Kinsbergen		
Feiko Boersma		
Charles Gilhuys

References

External links 
 

1914 films
Dutch silent feature films
Dutch black-and-white films
Films directed by Louis H. Chrispijn